Pseudouropoda is a genus of tortoise mites in the family Uropodidae. There is at least one described species in Pseudouropoda, P. breviunguiculata.

References

Uropodidae
Articles created by Qbugbot